Francis Needham, 1st Earl of Kilmorey (5 April 1748 – 21 November 1832), known as Francis Needham until 1818 and as The Viscount Kilmorey from 1818 to 1822, was an Anglo-Irish soldier and Member of Parliament.

Kilmorey was the third son of John Needham, 10th Viscount Kilmorey, and Anne (née Hurleston). He entered the British Army in 1762 and served in the American War of Independence, where he was taken prisoner at the Siege of Yorktown in 1781. He also fought in the French Revolutionary Wars but is best remembered for his role during the Irish Rebellion of 1798. He was in overall command at the Battle of Arklow and commanded one of the five columns at the Battle of Vinegar Hill. In 1804, he was appointed Colonel of the 5th Royal Veteran Battalion. He was promoted to colonel for life of the 86th Foot in 1810 and to general in 1812.

From 1806 to 1818 Kilmorey also represented Newry in the House of Commons. He succeeded his elder brother in the viscountcy in 1818 but as this was an Irish peerage it did not entitle him to a seat in the House of Lords. In 1822 he was honoured when he was made Viscount Newry and Mourne, in the County of Down, and Earl of Kilmorey. Both titles were in the Peerage of Ireland.

Lord Kilmorey married Anne, daughter of Thomas Fisher (1765–1816), in 1787. They had two sons and eight daughters:
Francis, 2nd Earl of Kilmorey (1787–1880)
Lady Frances Margaretta Anne (1789–1789)
Lady Anna Maria Elizabeth (1790–1866)
Lady Amelia (1791–1860)
Lady Frances Elizabeth (1792–1890)
Lady Selina (1794–1876)
Lady Georgiana (1795–1888)
Lady Alicia Mary (1796–1885)
 Francis Henry William (1799–1868)
Lady Mabella Josephine (1801–1899)

He died in November 1832, aged 84, and was succeeded in his titles by his eldest son Francis.

References

Kidd, Charles, Williamson, David (editors). Debrett's Peerage and Baronetage (1990 edition). New York: St Martin's Press, 1990.

www.thepeerage.com

External links 
 

|-

1748 births
1832 deaths
British Army personnel of the American Revolutionary War
British Army personnel of the French Revolutionary Wars
British Army generals
Members of the Parliament of the United Kingdom for Newry (1801–1918)
People of the Irish Rebellion of 1798
UK MPs 1806–1807
UK MPs 1807–1812
UK MPs 1812–1818
Kilmorey, E1
UK MPs who were granted peerages
Earls of Kilmorey
Peers of Ireland created by George IV